Lágrimas de amor is the first studio album by Camela. This album was the most successful of the group's career, even though it failed to enter charts. It was released in 1994 in Spain on CD and cassette format. All songs were written by Miguel Ángel Cabrera and recorded in the winter of 1993 to 1994 under the direction of Daniel Muneta.

The first single was "Lágrimas de amor".

List of songs
 "Lágrimas de amor" 3:58
 "No te acerques a mí" 3:52
 "Ilusiones" 3:48
 "Más la quiero yo" 3:34
 "Llorarás" 4:14
 "Mi madre, mi reina" 3:34
 "Marioneta de su vida" 3:58
 "Gaviota del amor" 3:50
 "Sueña mi corazón" 3:43
 "Estoy arrepentido" 4:03
 "Estrellas de mil colores" 3:21
 "Te quiero a morir" 3:28
Total: 45:23

External links 
https://web.archive.org/web/20110827152042/http://www.clubdefanscamela.com/discografia/oficial/lagrimas.html

1994 albums
Spanish-language albums